Garfield Township is one of sixteen townships in Calhoun County, Iowa, United States.  As of the 2000 census, its population was 230.

History
Garfield Township was created in 1882. It was named for James A. Garfield, 20th President of the United States, who had been assassinated the year prior.

Geography
According to the USGS, it contains one cemetery, Garfield.

References

External links
 City-Data.com

Townships in Calhoun County, Iowa
Townships in Iowa